Richard Arthur Bradsell (4 May 1959 – 27 February 2016) was a British bartender noted for his innovative work with cocktails, including the creation of many new drinks now considered to be modern classics.
The Observer described him as the "cocktail king", while Waitrose Food Illustrated compared him to celebrity chefs and the San Francisco Chronicle credited him with "single-handedly (changing) the face of the London cocktails scene in the 1980s."

Bradsell was born in Bishop's Stortford, England. He was acclaimed for inventing several new cocktails, including the Espresso Martini, the Bramble, the Treacle, the Carol Channing, the Russian Spring Punch and the Wibble. It was reported that Bradsell could "rarely enter a bar without an enthusiastic bartender thrusting his version of the (Espresso Martini) drink at him."

In 2003, he and Tony Conigliaro co-wrote several articles for the now-defunct bartending magazine Theme. Bradsell died from brain cancer on 27 February 2016 at his home in London.

References

External links
Interview with Dick Bradsell
List of London's best barmen, featuring Dick Bradsell as a 'Taste maker'
George Sinclair's Tribute Page
Dick Bradsell and his Bramble Cocktail

Theme articles archived on Scribd
Grumpy Old-Fashioned Men
Creativity Versus Authenticity
Dick Goes on the Defensive
Beware Wreckless Abandonment
Careering Through the Industry
Credit Where It's Due
Russian Spring Punch

Bartenders
People from Bishop's Stortford
1959 births
2016 deaths
Deaths from brain cancer in England